Dwight Oliver Wendell Holmes (November 18, 1877 – September 7, 1963) was an American sociologist, civil rights activist, collegiate athlete, author, and served as the 5th President of Morgan State College from 1937 to 1948.

Early life and career
Holmes was born in Lewisburg, West Virginia and raised in Annapolis, Maryland, New York City, and Staunton, Virginia. He was the son of the Reverend John A. Holmes, a pastor with the Metropolitan A.M.E. Church in Washington, D.C. for almost twenty years. As an undergraduate at Howard University, Holmes played quarterback and became the team captain of the Howard Bison football and baseball teams. Additionally, he became the president of the first tennis team at Howard, was a member of the debate and glee clubs.  He earned a B.A. degree in 1901 and was valedictorian of the graduating class. Afterwards, Holmes continued his collegiate studies at Columbia University, where he earned both a M.A. and Ph.D.

In 1934, he wrote The Evolution of the Negro College, a book focusing on the evolution of the Negro Colleges (what's now referred to as HBCUs), and the resources that these institutions should provide to the African-American population in the Southern states of the U.S. post-Civil War.

Holmes died on September 7, 1963 at the age of 85.

References

External links
 
 
"The History of Morgan State University" at C-SPAN

1877 births
1963 deaths
20th-century American novelists
African-American novelists
American male novelists
African-American social scientists
American sociologists
Columbia University alumni
Howard University alumni
Presidents of Morgan State University
People from Annapolis, Maryland
People from Lewisburg, West Virginia
Writers from New York City
Novelists from Maryland
Novelists from Virginia
Novelists from New York (state)
20th-century American male writers
20th-century African-American writers
African-American male writers